= David Zuberer =

American microbiologist

David A. Zuberer

Academic work
- Discipline: Microbiology
- Institutions: Texas A&M University

David A. Zuberer is an American microbiologist, currently Professor Emeritus at Texas A&M University.
